Bywong is a rural residential area in the Southern Tablelands of New South Wales, Australia in the Queanbeyan-Palerang Regional Council LGA. It is approximately 24 kilometres north-east of the Australian city of Canberra on the Federal Highway. It is also traversed by Macs Reef Road, Shingle Hill Way and Bungendore Road, the last two roads connecting Gundaroo and Bungendore. Its name is derived from an aboriginal word for "big hill". It had a public school from 1895 to 1906.
It has a community association called Bywong Community Inc.
Its local Pony Club is called Gearys Gap Pony Club, which meets at the Les Reardon Reserve, Bywong.

References

Localities in New South Wales
Yass Valley Council
Queanbeyan–Palerang Regional Council
Southern Tablelands